The 2013 Women's Under–18 Australian Hockey Championship was a field hockey competition organised by Hockey Australia. The tournament was held at the National Hockey Centre in Canberra, from 2–13 July 2013.

NSW won the tournament, defeating QLD in the final. WA finished in third place following a 2–0 victory over the ACT.

Competition format
The tournament followed a single round-robin format, with each team playing each other once during the pool stage. The top four ranked teams qualified for the semi-finals, while the bottom four teams progressed to the classification round.

Teams

  ACT
  NSW
  NT
  QLD
  SA
  TAS
  VIC
  WA

Results
All times are local (AEST).

Preliminary round

Fixtures

Classification round

Fifth to eighth place classification

Crossover

Seventh and eighth place

Fifth and sixth place

First to fourth place classification

Semi-finals

Third and fourth place

Final

References

External links
Hockey Australia

2013
2013 in Australian women's field hockey